Geophis fulvoguttatus, also known as Mertens's earth snake, is a snake of the colubrid family. It is found in El Salvador and Honduras.

References

Geophis
Snakes of North America
Reptiles of El Salvador
Reptiles of Honduras
Taxa named by Robert Mertens
Reptiles described in 1952